Alexander Theodore "Sasha" Shulgin (June 17, 1925 – June 2, 2014) was an American medicinal chemist, biochemist, organic chemist,  pharmacologist, psychopharmacologist, and author. He is credited with introducing 3,4-methylenedioxymethamphetamine (MDMA, commonly known as "ecstasy") to psychologists in the late 1970s for psychopharmaceutical use and for the discovery, synthesis and personal bioassay of over 230 psychoactive compounds for their psychedelic and entactogenic potential.

In 1991 and 1997, he and his wife Ann Shulgin compiled the books PiHKAL and TiHKAL (standing for Phenethylamines and Tryptamines I Have Known And Loved), from notebooks that extensively described their work and personal experiences with these two classes of psychoactive drugs. Shulgin performed seminal work into the descriptive synthesis of many of these compounds. Some of Shulgin's noteworthy discoveries include compounds of the 2C* family (such as 2C-B) and compounds of the DOx family (such as DOM).

Due in part to Shulgin's extensive work in the field of psychedelic research and the rational drug design of psychedelic drugs, he has since been dubbed the "godfather of psychedelics".

Life and career 
Shulgin was born in Berkeley, California, to Theodore Stevens Shulgin (1893–1978) and Henrietta D. (Aten) Shulgin (1894–1960). His father was born in Chelyabinsk, Russia; his mother was born in Illinois.  Theodore and Henrietta were public school teachers in Alameda County.

Shulgin began studying organic chemistry as a Harvard University scholarship student at the age of 16. In 1943 he dropped out of school to join the U.S. Navy. While serving on USS Pope during World War II, a nurse gave Shulgin a glass of orange juice prior to surgery for a thumb infection. Shulgin drank the juice and, assuming that the powder at the bottom of the glass was a sedative, fell asleep rapidly. Upon waking he learned that the powder was undissolved sugar. The experience made him aware of the influence of placebos over the human mind.

After serving in the Navy, Shulgin returned to Berkeley, California, and in 1954 earned his PhD in biochemistry from the University of California, Berkeley. Through the late 1950s Shulgin completed post-doctoral work in the fields of psychiatry and pharmacology at University of California, San Francisco. After working at Bio-Rad Laboratories as a research director for a brief period, he began work at Dow Chemical Company as a senior research chemist.

At this time he had a series of psychedelic experiences that helped to shape his further goals and research, the first of which was brought on by  mescaline.
"I first explored mescaline in the late '50s ... Three-hundred-fifty to 400 milligrams. I learned there was a great deal inside me."

Shulgin later reported personal revelations that "had been brought about by a fraction of a gram of a white solid, but that in no way whatsoever could it be argued that these memories had been contained within the white solid ... I understood that our entire universe is contained in the mind and the spirit. We may choose not to find access to it, we may even deny its existence, but it is indeed there inside us, and there are chemicals that can catalyze its availability."

Shulgin's professional activities continued to lean in the direction of psychopharmacology, furthered by his personal experiences with psychedelics. But during this period he was unable to do much independent research. His opportunity for further research came in 1961 after his development of Zectran, the first biodegradable pesticide, a highly profitable product. In his book PiHKAL, Shulgin limits his pesticide days at Dow Chemical to one sentence in 978 pages. Dow Chemical Company, in return for Zectran's valuable patent, gave Shulgin great freedom. During this time, he created and patented drugs when Dow asked, and published findings on other drugs in journals such as Nature and the Journal of Organic Chemistry. Eventually, Dow Chemical requested that he no longer use their name on his publications.

In late 1966, Shulgin left Dow in order to pursue his own interests. He first spent two years studying neurology at the University of California, San Francisco School of Medicine, leaving to work on a consulting project. He set up a home-based lab on his property, known as "the Farm", and became a private consultant. He also taught classes in the local universities and at the San Francisco General Hospital. Through his friend Bob Sager, head of the U.S. DEA's Western Laboratories, Shulgin formed a relationship with the DEA and began holding pharmacology seminars for the agents, supplying the DEA with samples of various compounds, and occasionally serving as an expert witness in court. In 1988, he authored a then-definitive law enforcement reference book on controlled substances, and received several awards from the DEA.

Personal life, health, and death 
Shulgin was married to Nina Gordon until her death. He then married author Ann Gotlieb. He spent most of his later life at the Farm in Lafayette, California.

On April 8, 2008, at the age of 82, he underwent surgery to replace a defective aortic valve. On November 16, 2010, he suffered a stroke, from which he largely recovered. Also at the close of 2010, a skin-grafting surgery saved his left foot from being amputated. Around this time, Shulgin began showing early signs of dementia, mostly severe loss of short-term memory. With progression of the dementia since 2010, his wife, Ann Shulgin, had been trying to sell part of their property to raise more money to cover care costs.

On April 17, 2014, Ann Shulgin reported on Facebook that her husband had developed liver cancer, and in a May 31 update on Facebook she said that, although appearing frail, he seemed to be experiencing his last moments in peace and without pain. Shulgin died at his home on June 2, 2014, at the age of 88.

Independent research 
In order to work with scheduled psychoactive chemicals, Shulgin obtained a DEA Schedule I license for an analytical laboratory, which allowed him to synthesize and possess any otherwise illicit drug. Shulgin set up a chemical synthesis laboratory in a small building behind his house, which gave him a great deal of career autonomy. Shulgin used this freedom to synthesize and test the effects of potentially psychoactive drugs.

In 1976, Shulgin was introduced to MDMA by a student in the medicinal chemistry group he advised at San Francisco State University. MDMA had been synthesized in 1912 by Merck and patented in 1913 as an intermediate of another synthesis in order to block competitors, but was never explored in its own right. Shulgin went on to develop a new synthesis method, and in 1976, introduced the chemical to Leo Zeff, a psychologist from Oakland, California. Zeff used the substance in his practice in small doses as an aid to talk therapy. Zeff introduced the substance to hundreds of psychologists and lay therapists around the nation, including Ann (born Laura Ann Gotlieb), whom Alexander Shulgin met in 1979, and married in 1981. It was her fourth marriage, and she had four children.

After judicious self-experiments, Shulgin enlisted a small group of friends with whom he regularly tested his creations, starting in 1960. They developed a systematic way of ranking the effects of the various drugs, known as the Shulgin Rating Scale, with a vocabulary to describe the visual, auditory and physical sensations. He personally tested hundreds of drugs, mainly analogues of various phenethylamines (family containing MDMA, mescaline, and the 2C* family), and tryptamines (family containing DMT and psilocin). There are a seemingly infinite number of slight chemical variations, which can produce variations in effect — some pleasant and some unpleasant, depending on the person, substance, and situation — all of which are meticulously recorded in Shulgin's lab notebooks. Shulgin published many of these objective and subjective reports in his books and papers. About 2C-B he said in 2003: "It is, in my opinion, one of the most graceful, erotic, sensual, introspective compounds I have ever invented. For most people, it is a short-lived and comfortable psychedelic, with neither toxic side-effects nor next-day hang-over."

In 1994, two years after the publication of PIHKAL, the DEA raided his lab. The agency requested that Shulgin turn over his license for violating the license's terms, and he was fined $25,000 for possession of anonymous samples sent to him for quality testing. In the 15 years preceding the publication of PIHKAL, two announced and scheduled reviews failed to find any irregularities. Richard Meyer, spokesman for DEA's San Francisco Field Division, has stated that, "It is our opinion that those books are pretty much cookbooks on how to make illegal drugs. Agents tell me that in clandestine labs that they have raided, they have found copies of those books."

Prior to his 2010 health issues, Shulgin had been working on a series of N-allylated tryptamines including 5-MeO-DALT and 5-MeO-MALT.

Legacy 
In a 2014 review of the synthesis of designer drugs, the effects of Shulgin's work were described as "by far the most far-reaching" effects associated with the cultural climate of interest at the time in hallucinogenic compounds generally and mescaline in particular, with which various artists and writers had experimented. Shulgin said that mescaline made him aware of a world submerged in human spirit, whose "availability" was "catalyzed" by such chemicals; the consequences of his insights were called "devastating" by the reviewers. In the same review, an example of his insights was given by his description of MDMA as "his low-calorie Martini".

Societies 
Shulgin was a member of Mensa International and frequently attended Mensa events in California.

Alexander was a Bohemian Club member. The Bohemian club is located in California where Alexander lived. Alexander refers to "The Owl Club" in chapter 11 of PiHKAL:

Bibliography

Books
 Controlled Substances: Chemical & Legal Guide to Federal Drug Laws. Berkeley, Calif.: Ronin Publishing (1988). .
 PiHKAL: A Chemical Love Story,  with Ann Shulgin. Berkeley, Calif.: Transform Press (1991). .
 TiHKAL: The Continuation, with Ann Shulgin. Berkeley, Calif.: Transform Press (1997). .
 The Simple Plant Isoquinolines , with Wendy Perry. Berkeley, Calif.: Transform Press (2002). .
 The Shulgin Index, vol. 1: Psychedelic Phenethylamines and Related Compounds, with Tania Manning and Paul Daley. Berkeley, Calif.: Transform Press (2011). .
 Appendix B: Web Addresses for State Statutes on Phenethylamine Psychedelics.

Book contributions
 "A New Vocabulary," with Ann Shulgin. In: Entheogens and the Future of Religion, edited by Robert Forte. Berkeley, Calif.: Council on Spiritual Practices (1997). .
 Foreword to Chemical Warfare Secrets Almost Forgotten: A Personal Story of Medical Testing of Army Volunteers with Incapacitating Chemical Agents During the Cold War (1955–1975), by James S. Ketchum. Santa Rosa, California: ChemBooks (2006), pp. 331–333. . .

Laboratory notebooks
 Pharmacology Notes.

 1960–1979. Lab notebooks of Dr. Shulgin
 1963. "Psychotomimetic agents related to mescaline". Experientia 19: 127. 19
 1963. "Composition of the myristicin fraction from oil of nutmeg". Nature 197: 379. 20
 1963. "Concerning the pharmacology of nutmeg". Mind 1: 299–302. 23
 1964. "3-methoxy-4,5-methylenedioxy amphetamine, a new psychotomimetic agent". Nature 201: 1120–1121. 29
 1964. "Psychotomimetic amphetamines: methoxy 3,4-dialkoxyamphetamines". Experientia 20: 366. 30
 1964. with H. O. Kerlinger. "Isolation of methoxyeugenol and trans-isoelemicin from oil of nutmeg". Naturwissenschaften 15: 360–361. 31
 1965. "Synthesis of the trimethoxyphenylpropenes". Can. J. Chem. 43: 3437–3440. 43
 1966. "Possible implication of myristicin as a psychotropic substance". Nature 210: 380–384. 45
 1966. "The six trimethoxyphenylisopropylamines (trimethoxyamphetamines)". J. Med. Chem. 9: 445–446. 46
 1966. with T. Sargent, and C. Naranjo. "Role of 3,4-Dimethoxyphenethylamine in schizophrenia". Nature 212: 1606–1607. 48
 1967. with T. Sargent, and C. Naranjo. "The chemistry and psychopharmacology of nutmeg and of several related phenylisopropylamines". In D. H. Efron [ed.]: Ethnopharmacologic search for psychoactive drugs. U. S. Dept. of H. E. W., Public Health Service Publication No. 1645. Pp. 202–214. Discussion: ibid. pp. 223–229. 49
 1967. with T. Sargent. "Psychotropic phenylisopropylamines derived from apiole and dillapiole". Nature 215: 1494–1495. 50
 1967. with Sargent, T. W., D. M. Israelstam, S. A. Landaw, and N. N. Finley. "A note concerning the fate of the 4-methoxyl group in 3,4-dimethoxyphenethylamine (DMPEA)". Biochem. Biophys. Res. Commun. 29: 126–130. 52
 1967. with Naranjo, C. and T. Sargent. "Evaluation of 3,4-methylenedioxyamphetamine (MDA) as an adjunct to psychotherapy". Med. Pharmacol. Exp. 17: 359–364. 53
 1968. "The ethyl homologs of 2,4,5-trimethoxyphenylisopropylamine". J. Med. Chem. 11: 186–187. 54
 1969. with T. Sargent and C. Naranjo. "Structure activity relationships of one-ring psychotomimetics". Nature 221: 537–541. 57
 1969. "Recent developments in cannabis chemistry". J. Psyched. Drugs 2: 15–29. 58
 1969. "Psychotomimetic agents related to the catecholamines". J. Psyched. Drugs 2(2): 12–26. 59
 1970. "Chemistry and structure-activity relationships of the psychotomimetics". In D. H. Efron [ed.]. "Psychotomimetic Drugs". Raven Press, New York. Pp. 21–41. 60
 1970. "The mode of action of psychotomimetic drugs; some qualitative properties of the psychotomimetics". Neur. Res. Prog. Bull. 8: 72–78. 61
 1970. "4-alkyl-dialkoxy-alpha-methyl-phenethylamines and their pharmacologically-acceptable salts". U. S. Patent 3,547,999, issued December 15, 1970. 63
 1971. with T. Sargent and C. Naranjo. "4-bromo-2,5-dimethoxyphenylisopropylamine, a new centrally active amphetamine analog". Pharmacology 5: 103–107. 64
 1971. "Chemistry and sources". In S. S. Epstein [ed]. "Drugs of abuse: their genetic and other chronic nonpsychiatric hazards". The MIT Press, Cambridge, Mass. Pp 3–26. 65
 1971. "Preliminary studies of the synthesis of nitrogen analogs of Delta1-THC". Acta Pharm. Suec. 8: 680–681. 66
 1972. "Hallucinogens, CNS stimulants, and cannabis. In S. J. Mulé and H. Brill [eds.]: Chemical and biological aspects of drug dependence". CRC Press, Cleveland, Ohio. Pp. 163–175. 67
 1973. "Stereospecific requirements for hallucinogenesis". J. Pharm. Pharmac. 25: 271–272. 68
 1973. "Mescaline: the chemistry and pharmacology of its analogs". Lloydia 36: 46–58. 69
 1973. "The narcotic pepper – the chemistry and pharmacology of Piper methysticum and related species". Bull. Narc. 25: 59–1974. "Le poivre stupéfiant – chemie et pharmacologie du Piper methysticum et des espéces apparentées". Bull. Stupéfiants 25: 61–77. 70
 1973. with T. Sargent and C. Naranjo. "Animal pharmacology and human psychopharmacology of 3-methoxy-4,5-methylenedioxyphenylisopropylamine (MMDA)". Pharmacology 10: 12–18. 71
 1974. with Kalbhen, D. A., T. Sargent, G. Braun, H. Stauffer, N. Kusubov, and M. L. Nohr. "Human pharmacodynamics of the psychodysleptic 4-bromo-2,5-dimethoxyphenylisopropylamine labelled with [82]Br". IRCS (Int. Res. Comm. Sys.) 2: 1091. 73
 1975. with Sargent, T., D. A. Kalbhen, H. Stauffer, and N. Kusubov.  "A potential new brain-scanning agent: 4-[77]Br-2,5-dimethoxyphenylisopropylamine (4-Br-DPIA)". J. Nucl. Med. 16: 243–245. 74
 1975. with M. F. Carter. "Centrally active phenethylamines". Psychopharm. Commun. 1: 93–98. 75
 1975. with Sargent, T., D. A. Kalbhen, G. Braun, H. Stauffer, and N. Kusubov. "In vivo human pharmacodynamics of the psychodysleptic 4-Br-2,5-dimethoxyphenylisopropylamine labelled with [82]Br or [77]Br". Neuropharmacology 14: 165–174. 76
 1975. "The chemical catalysis of altered states of consciousness. Altered states of consciousness, current views and research problems". The drug abuse council, Washington, D. C. Pp. 123–134. 77
 1975. "Drug use and anti-drug legislation". The PharmChem Newsletter 4 (#8). 79
 1975. with D. C. Dyer. "Psychotomimetic phenylisopropylamines. 5. 4-alkyl-2,5-dimethoxyphenylisopropylamines". J. Med. Chem. 18: 1201–1204. 80
 1975. with C. Helisten. "Differentiation of PCP, TCP, and a contaminating precursor PCC, by thin layer chromatography". Microgram 8: 171–172. 81
 1975. with Helisten, C. "The detection of 1-piperidinodydlohexanecarbonitrile contamination in illicit preparations of 1-(1-phenylcyclohexyl)piperidine and 1-(1-(2-thienyl)cyclohexyl)piperidine". J. Chrom. 117: 232–235. 82
 1976. "Psychotomimetic agents". In M. Gordon [ed.] "Psychopharmacological agents", Vol. 4. Academic Press, New York. Pp. 59–146. 83
 1976. "Abuse of the term 'amphetamines'". Clin. Tox. 9: 351–352. 84
 1976. "Profiles of psychedelic drugs. 1. DMT". J. Psychedelic Drugs 8: 167–168. 85
 1976. "Profiles of psychedelic drugs. 2. TMA-2". J. Psychedelic Drugs 8: 169. 86
 1976. with D. E. MacLean. "Illicit synthesis of phencyclidine (PCP) and several of its analogs". Clin. Tox. 9: 553–560. 87
 1976. with Nichols, D. E. "Sulfur analogs of psychotomimetic amines". J. Pharm. Sci. 65: 1554–1556. 89
 1976. with Sargent, T. and N. Kusubov. "Quantitative measurement of demethylation of [14]C-methoxyl labeled DMPEA and TMA-2 in rats". Psychopharm. Commun. 2: 199–206. 90
 1976. with Standridge, R. T., H. G. Howell, J. A. Gylys, R. A. Partyka. "Phenylalkylamines with potential psychotherapeutic utility. 1. 2-amino-1-(2,5,-dimethoxy-4-methylphenyl)butane". J. Med. Chem. 19: 1400–1404. 91
 1976. "Profiles of psychedelic drugs. 3. MMDA". J. Psychedelic Drugs 8: 331. 92
 1977. "Profiles of psychedelic drugs. 4. Harmaline". J. Psychedelic Drugs 9: 79–80. 93
 1977. "Profiles of psychedelic drugs. 5. STP". J. Psychedelic Drugs 9: 171–172. 94
 1977. with Nichols, D. E., and D. C. Dyer.  "Directional lipophilic character in a series of psychotomimetic phenethylamine derivatives". Life Sciences 21: 569–576. 95
 1977. with Jacob, P. III, G. Anderson III, C. K. Meshul, and N. Castagnoli Jr. "Mononethylthio analogues of 1-(2,4,5-trimethoxyphenyl)2-aminopropane". J. Med. Chem. 20: 1235–1239. 96

References

External links 

 Alexander Shulgin Research Institute (ASRI)
 "Dirty Pictures". Documentary. 2010.
Erowid's Alexander Shulgin Vault
Transform Press – publisher of Alexander Shulgin's books

1925 births
2014 deaths
20th-century American male writers
20th-century American non-fiction writers
20th-century American chemists
21st-century American male writers
21st-century American non-fiction writers
21st-century American chemists
American male non-fiction writers
American people of Russian descent
American pharmacologists
Deaths from cancer in California
Deaths from liver cancer
Dow Chemical Company employees
Harvard University alumni
Mensans
People from Lafayette, California
American psychedelic drug advocates
Psychedelic drug researchers
Psychopharmacologists
Scientists from California
United States Navy personnel of World War II
United States Navy sailors
University of California, Berkeley alumni
University of California, San Francisco alumni
Writers from Berkeley, California